Imperial Circus Dead Decadence is a Japanese doujin music group formed in Fukuoka in 2007 mixing different styles of metal music genres including melodic death metal, symphonic metal and power metal.

History 
The doujin project was formed in 2007 in Fukuoka. After several line-up changes, the group now consists of female vocalist Akira Natsuki, male vocalist Rib:y(uhki), guitarist Kim, as well as drummer Shūhei Kamada. Since Imperial Circus Dead Decadence's inception, they have been supported by other musicians such as Kimiko, vocalist of power metal band Bridear, and Shuhei, former musician of the visual kei band Asriel.

In 2008, the group self-released their debut album Sangeki no Chi ni Akaku Somatta Ai to Zetsubou no Kuroi Shi to ga Tsumugu Saigo no Monogatari. In 2010 and 2011, Imperial Circus Dead Decadence published their Haishita Shoujo wa, Haiyoru Konton to Kaikousu. EP and Kuruoshiku Saita Seisan na Mukuro wa Kanade, Itooshiku Saita Shoujo wa Seisan no Uta wo Utau. album, respectively. In 2014 and 2017, the group published their next two EPs, Yomi yori Kikoyu, Koukoku no Hi to Honoo no Shoujo. and Fushoku Ressentiment, Fushi Yoku no Sarugakuza..

In April 2022, Imperial Circus Dead Decadence announced they would release their third full-length album called MOGARI――Shi e Fukeru Omoi wa Rikujoku Sura Kurai, Kanata no Sei wo Aisuru Tame ni Inochi wo Tataeru――. on June 1, 2022. The album is their first full-length in 11 years. Despite being produced by an independent group, the album managed to rank at 61 in the Japanese Albums Chart.

Music 
The music of Imperial Circus Dead Decadence is a mixture of different types of metal, including elements of melodic death metal, symphonic metal, and power metal, as well as metalcore and deathcore. In an album review on Angrymetalguy.com, Eldritch Elitist described the music as a death metal hybrid of Chthonic, the brutal symphonics of Fleshgod Apocalypse and the gothic dramatical touch of Cradle of Filth.

Many of the group’s songs reach lengths of eight minutes or more, and are entirely written in Japanese and a fictional language called Taihaisekai by the musicians. The lyrics tell a conceptional plot using eerie, dark fantastical themes.

Discography 
Studio albums

Extended Plays

Weblinks 
 Official Homepage

References 

Doujin music
Japanese melodic death metal musical groups
Japanese power metal musical groups
Japanese symphonic metal musical groups
Japanese metalcore musical groups
Musical groups established in 2007